The following is a list of episodes for the Disney Channel Original Series Wizards of Waverly Place. The series aired from October 12, 2007, to January 6, 2012. A total of 106 episodes were aired, spanning four seasons, along with an hour-long "return" episode that aired on March 15, 2013.

The series revolves around Alex Russo (Selena Gomez), a teenage wizard who is competing with her siblings Justin (David Henrie) and Max (Jake T. Austin) to become the sole wizard in their family to keep their powers. In 2009, the series won a Primetime Emmy Award for "Outstanding Children's Program".

Series overview

Episodes

Season 1 (2007–08)

Season 2 (2008–09)

Film (2009)

Season 3 (2009–10)

Season 4 (2010–12)

Special (2013)

See also
 List of The Suite Life on Deck episodes - includes "Double-Crossed", part two of 'Wizards on Deck with Hannah Montana' crossover

References

General references 

Lists of American children's television series episodes
Lists of American sitcom episodes
Lists of Disney Channel television series episodes
Episodes

it:I maghi di Waverly#Episodi